Robert Randolph Bruce (July 16, 1861 – February 21, 1942) was an engineer, mining proprietor and the 13th Lieutenant Governor of British Columbia from 1926 to 1931.

Bruce was born in Scotland and educated at the University of Glasgow where he studied engineering. He emigrated to the United States in 1887 before arriving in Canada to work for the Canadian Pacific Railway. In 1897 he settled in British Columbia to become a prospector. Bruce and his partner established a lead and silver mine near  Windermere Lake in the East Kootenay region of British Columbia. He purchased land from the railway and promoted it in England for settlement.

Bruce became the province's lieutenant-governor in 1926. Unusually for former viceroys, he attempted to enter politics following his tenure as the Queen's representative and stood for the Liberal Party of Canada in the 1935 federal election but was narrowly defeated by Henry Herbert Stevens in the riding of Kootenay East. The government of William Lyon Mackenzie King appointed Bruce as Canada's second envoy to Japan with the title of Minister Plenipotentiary in 1936. He served for two years before retiring to Montreal.

Notes

Foreign Affairs and International Trade Canada Complete List of Posts

Sources
Official biography, British Columbia Lieutenant-Governor's Office

1861 births
1942 deaths
Lieutenant Governors of British Columbia
British Columbia candidates for Member of Parliament
Candidates in the 1935 Canadian federal election
Ambassadors of Canada to Japan
Liberal Party of Canada candidates for the Canadian House of Commons